Kween or Kweens may refer to:

People
Khuen people, or Kween people, an aboriginal ethnic group of Laos
Kenny Kweens, an American musician

Places
Kween District, Eastern Region, Uganda
Kween County, a county of Uganda
Kween, Uganda, a town in the county of Kween, on the Kapchorwa–Suam Road

Other uses
Kween, a fictional character in the film Nerve

See also
 
 
 Queen (disambiguation)
 Queens (disambiguation)
 Kweens Foundation, founded by Young M.A